Mexico sent a delegation to compete at the 1988 Summer Paralympics in Seoul, South Korea. Its athletes finished twenty-fourth in the overall medal count.

Medalists

See also 
 1988 Summer Paralympics
 Mexico at the 1988 Summer Olympics

References 

Nations at the 1988 Summer Paralympics
1988
Summer Paralympics